The Jek Bridge (also Jeklarski most, Jekavski most, Razorčev most 'Razorec Bridge') is a bridge crossing the Gradaščica River in Ljubljana, the capital of Slovenia. The current structure was built in 1903 at the site of an earlier wooden bridge.

The various names are derived from the toponym na Jeku (literally, 'on the hill' < German Ecke), which referred to a nearby wharf, and from the former Razorec Inn, located at Church Street no. 1, today (Ernest) Eypper Street.

References

Bridges in Ljubljana
Road bridges in Slovenia
Bridges over the Gradaščica
Trnovo District
Bridges completed in 1903
20th-century architecture in Slovenia